Bathypalaemonellidae is a family of crustaceans belonging to the order Decapoda.

Genera:
 Bathypalaemonella Balss, 1914
 Bathypalaemonetes Cleva, 2001

References

Decapods